Kyauk Lone (also spelt as Kyauk Lon) was three-time Myanmar Academy Award-winning Burmese actor. He was the first recipient of the Best Supporting Actor Academy Award in the Burmese film industry.

He won his first Myanmar Academy Award in 1962 with the film Ah Twae, achieved his second award in 1964 with the film Yinwae Ta Theint Theint and the third award in 1965 with the film Chit Thamee.

Early life and education 
His birth name is Aung Gyi and he was born in 1917 in Natogyi, Myingyan District, to his father U Thay and Daw Tin. He is the fourth of seven siblings. As a child, he was educated in Myingyan and passed the tenth grade.

Personal life
Kyauk and his wife, Daw Mya Mya, have seven children, and only his granddaughter, Wah Wah Aung, entered the art world.

Death
He died on 26 May 1982 at the age of 63 at his home in Tamwe Township, Rangoon.

Awards and nominations

References 

1981 deaths
1917 births
Burmese male film actors
People from Bago Region